Mark Lewis Zwonitzer (born August 28, 1962) is an American author and documentary filmmaker.

Books 

Zwonitzer has written two non-fiction biographies.

Will You Miss Me When I'm Gone? The Carter Family & Their Legacy in American Music
"Will You Miss Me When I'm Gone?," written with Charles Hirshberg, is a biography of the Carter Family, musical pioneers who created the sounds and traditions that grew into modern folk, country and bluegrass music.

The book was a finalist for the National Book Critics Circle Award in the biography/autobiography category in 2002.

One reviewer wrote, "The Carter Family finally get their due in documentary filmmaker Mark Zwonitzer's comprehensive biography. Zwonitzer follows the Carter family's history from the 1891 birth of A.P. Carter, the musical founder, up through the late 1970s, offering background on the social, economic and technological developments that spawned American folk, country and rock music."

Reviewer David Gates wrote in The New York Times, "Such characters and stories -- not to mention the music -- deserve a better book than Will You Miss Me When I'm Gone, and unfortunately no publisher will want one for another generation. The writing wobbles between workmanlike and cheesy."

The Statesman and The Storyteller: John Hay, Mark Twain and The Rise of American Imperialism
Due April 26, 2016, from Algonquin Books, an imprint of Workman Publishing.

Films and Television 
• American Experience, television series, 1988–present, on PBS. Episode director: "Joe DiMaggio: The Hero's Life" (S12|E14, 2000); "Mount Rushmore" (S14|E6, 2002); "The Transcontinental Railroad" (S15|E7, co-directed with Michael Chin, 2003); "The Massie Affair" (S17|E11 2005); "Jesse James" (S18|E7 2006); "Walt Whitman" (S20/E11 2008); "Robert E. Lee" (S23|E4 2011).

References

1962 births
Living people
American writers
American filmmakers